Organi is a village and a former community in the Rhodope regional unit, East Macedonia and Thrace, Greece. Since the 2011 local government reform it is part of the municipality Arriana, of which it is a municipal unit. The municipal unit has an area of 215.665 km2. Population 2,183 (2011).

References

Populated places in Rhodope (regional unit)